Marko Rakonjac (born 25 April 2000) is a Montenegrin professional footballer who plays as a centre-forward for Red Star Belgrade on loan from Russian Premier League club Lokomotiv Moscow.

Club career
On 28 April 2022, Rakonjac signed a four-year contract with Russian Premier League club Lokomotiv Moscow, beginning in the 2022–23 season.

On 2 February 2023, Rakonjac returned to Serbia to join Red Star Belgrade on loan until the end of the season with the option to buy.

International career
Rakonjac was called in Montenegro U15, Montenegro U17, Montenegro U18, Montenegro U19 and Montenegro U21 national team squads before becoming part of Montenegro national football team, and debuting as a substitution in a friendly win against Greece.

Career statistics

References

External links
 
 
 

2000 births
People from Bijelo Polje
Living people
Montenegrin footballers
Montenegro youth international footballers
Montenegro under-21 international footballers
Montenegro international footballers
Association football forwards
FK Jedinstvo Bijelo Polje players
FK Čukarički players
FK IMT players
FC Lokomotiv Moscow players
Red Star Belgrade footballers
Montenegrin First League players
Serbian SuperLiga players
Russian Premier League players
Montenegrin expatriate footballers
Expatriate footballers in Serbia
Montenegrin expatriate sportspeople in Serbia
Expatriate footballers in Russia
Montenegrin expatriate sportspeople in Russia